Madonna and Child is a 1496 oil on panel painting by Cima da Conegliano, now in the Museo Civico in Gemona del Friuli.

References

Gemona del Friuli
Paintings in Friuli-Venezia Giulia
1496 paintings